The Monad in Gnosticism is an adaptation of concepts of the Monad in Greek philosophy to Christian gnostic belief systems.

Overview
The term monad comes from the Greek feminine noun monas (nominative singular, μονάς), "one unit," where the ending -s in the nominative form resolves to the ending -d in declension.

In some gnostic systems, the Supreme Being is known as the Monad, the One, the Absolute, Aiōn Teleos (the Perfect Aeon), Bythos (Depth or Profundity), Proarchē (Before the Beginning), Hē Archē (The Beginning), the Ineffable Parent, and/or the primal Father.

Prominent early Christian gnostics like Valentinus taught that the Monad is the high source of the Pleroma, the region of light constituting "the fullness of the Godhead." Through a process of emanation, various divine entities and realms emerge from the One. Arranged hierarchically, they become progressively degraded due to their remoteness from the Father. The various emanations of the One, totaling thirty in number (or 365, according to Basilides), are called Aeons. Among them exist Jesus (who resides close to the Father) and the lowest emanation, Sophia (wisdom), whose fall results in the creation of the material world.

According to Theodoret's book on heresies (Haereticarum Fabularum Compendium i.18), the Arab Christian Monoimus (c. 150–210) used the term Monad to mean the highest god that created lesser gods, or elements (similar to Aeons). In some versions of Christian gnosticism, especially those deriving from Valentinius, a lesser deity known as the Demiurge (see also Neoplatonism, Plotinus) had a role in the creation of the material world separate from the Monad. In these forms of gnosticism, the God of the Old Testament, YHWH, is often considered to have been the Demiurge, not the Monad, or sometimes different passages are interpreted as referring to each.

Apocryphon of John, written , gives the following description:

Historical background
According to Hippolytus of Rome, this view was inspired by the Pythagoreans, for whom the first existing thing was the Monad, which begat the dyad, which begat the numbers, which begat the point, begetting lines, and so on. Pythagorean and Platonic philosophers like Plotinus and Porphyry condemned the "gnosis" that would later characterize Gnostic systems for their treatment of the Monad or One (see Neoplatonism and Gnosticism).

For a long time, legend persisted that a young man by the name of Epiphanes, who died at the age of 17, was the leader of Monadic Gnosticism. However, scholars think the legend may have come from misunderstanding of the Greek word epiphanēs which may have been mistaken as a personal name if in text, when in fact the Greek means distinguished, as in a distinguished teacher.

See also
Hayyi Rabbi
Monad (disambiguation)
Holy Book of the Great Invisible Spirit

References 

Gnostic deities
Gnosticism
Conceptions of God
Names of God in Gnosticism